Streptomyces bluensis is a bacterium species from the genus of Streptomyces which produces bluensomycin.

See also 
 List of Streptomyces species

References

Further reading

External links
Type strain of Streptomyces bluensis at BacDive -  the Bacterial Diversity Metadatabase

bluensis
Bacteria described in 1963